Michael Joshua Francis Harding (born October 18, 2001) is an American soccer player who plays for  side Barwell, where he plays as a forward.

Playing career

Northampton Town
Harding made his first-team debut for Northampton Town on December 3, 2019, coming on as a 69th-minute substitute in a 2–1 defeat at Portsmouth in the EFL Trophy.

Kettering Town
On January 1, 2020, he joined Kettering Town on work experience.

St Ives Town
Harding signed for Southern League Premier Division Central side St Ives Town on October 26, 2020.

Beaconsfield Town
On 2 November 2021, it was confirmed that Harding had signed for Southern League Premier Division South side Beaconsfield Town.

Barwell
Harding signed for Southern League Premier Division Central side Barwell on 30 July 2022. He made his debut for Barwell on 6 August 2022 in a Southern League Premier Division Central fixture at home to Hitchin Town, the match finished 2–1 to the visitors.

Career statistics

Club

References

External links

2001 births
Living people
American soccer players
American expatriate soccer players
Barwell F.C. players
Beaconsfield Town F.C. players
Expatriate footballers in England
Northampton Town F.C. players
Kettering Town F.C. players
St Ives Town F.C. players
National League (English football) players